ET.317 was a thermonuclear weapon of the British Royal Navy, developed for the UK version of the UGM-27 Polaris missile.

Development 
The US Polaris A-3T warhead was the US W58. Britain considered but never used the W58 because the British safety authorities considered it unsafe in several respects. Instead they fitted a hybrid of a US W59 fusion secondary, triggered by a new British primary based on a Cleo boosted-fission device tested in Nevada as PAMPAS and TENDRAC. Variants of this basic design were used or intended for several other delivery systems, including the WE.177 bomb, UK Skybolt ALBM, and the Blue Water SSM (a tactical battlefield missile), and several others.

Documents declassified and released into the public domain in 2012 disclose that ET.317 was a warhead that used the fission-fusion-fission process, where a boosted-fission device codenamed  Jennie  triggered a fusion secondary codenamed  Reggie  which in turn was encased in U-238 depleted uranium. In the conditions created in the fusion process, vast quantities of free neutrons are liberated, and the normally unfissionable U-238 casing fissions. This results in a smaller, lighter, cheaper, dirtier weapon than one using only a fission-fusion process. Fission of the depleted uranium casing can generate a significant proportion of total weapon yield, and compared to other fissile material U-238 is cheap and plentiful as a waste product from HEU manufacture.  Jennie  was based on the  Cleo  device tested at PAMPAS and TENDRAC.  Reggie  was based on the US W59 fusion secondary.

Since the  Reggie  secondary manufactured in the UK from British-owned materials was a copy of the US W59, by implication, the  W59 thermonuclear weapon deployed in some Minuteman I ICBMs also used the fission-fusion-fission process.

The yield of ET.317 was stated in official documents on many occasions to be 200 kt. When retired, the  Reggie  fusion secondary was recycled and reused in its successor, the Chevaline warhead, matched to a new boosted-fission trigger codenamed Harriet. In that form, it is claimed to yield 225 kt, although there are as yet no official sources for that claim. Because the Chevaline warheads numbered two per missile, rather than the previous three ET.317 warheads, the surplus warheads were dismantled and while Jennie was no longer required, some Reggie secondaries were refurbished and installed as the secondary in WE.177C aircraft-delivered tactical nuclear bombs.

References

Cold War weapons of the United Kingdom
Nuclear weapons of the United Kingdom
Polaris (UK nuclear programme)